Bronisława Czecha Street is located in Warsaw, Poland. It is part of National road 2 and European route E30. Its dual carriageway and runs mainly through forest. It is one of three roads connecting Wesoła district with the rest of Warsaw. Other two streets are Korkowa Street and Cyrulików Street.

The patron of the street is Bronisław Czech, a Polish skier and Olympian.

References 

Czecha